Belonocnema is a genus of oak gall wasps in the family Cynipidae. There are three described species: B. treatae, B. fossoria and B. kinseyi. These species are found in the United States from Texas, east to Florida.

Belonocnema species induce galls on oaks and have both sexual and asexual generations. A number of inquiline, parasitoid, and hyperparasitoid wasp species have been reared from Belonocnema galls.

Taxonomy 

The genus was first named and described by Gustav Mayr in 1881 with Belonocnema treatae as the type species. The taxonomy of the species in the genus has been subject to different interpretations but now appears resolved through study of the morphology, ecology, and genetics of the genus. The genus Dryorhizoxenus, described by William Ashmead, is considered a synonym of Belonocnema, with its type species, D. floridanus, included in B. treatae.

References 

Cynipidae
Articles created by Qbugbot

Hymenoptera genera
Taxa named by Gustav Mayr
Gall-inducing insects
Oak galls